Stephen Roszel Donohoe (February 1, 1851 – January 3, 1921) was an American politician who served in the Virginia Senate. In 1910, he was appointed by Governor William Hodges Mann as the state's Auditor of Public Accounts.

References

External links

1851 births
1921 deaths
19th-century American politicians
20th-century American politicians
Virginia state senators